Baykal is a village in Nizhnetavdinsky District of Tyumen Oblast, Russia.

Rural localities in Tyumen Oblast